Micrasteridae is a family of echinoderms belonging to the order Spatangoida.

Genera

Genera:
 Brissopneustes
 Cyclaster Cotteau, 1856
 Diplodetus Schlüter, 1900

References

Spatangoida
Echinoderm families